The 47th International Film Festival of India was held on 20 to 28 November 2016 in Goa. 
Filmmaker Nagesh Kukunoor, who was appointed Chairman of the Indian panorama section, and Sameer Arya as the Member head of the panel.

Juries

International competition
 Ivan Passer, Czech Republican writer and director, Chairperson
 Larry Smith
 Lordan Zafranovič, Yugoslavian director
 Nagesh Kukunoor, Indian director
 Leïla Kilani, Moroccan director, screenwriter, and producer

Indian Panorama

Feature films 
Rama Vij, Actress
Arup Manna, Director
C V Reddy, Producer and Director
Girish Mohite, Producer and Director
K. Puttaswamy, Writer
N . Krishnakumar, Producer and Director
Sabyasachi Mohapatra, Filmmaker
Sanjay Pawar, Director and Columnist
Satinder Mohan, Critic and Journalist
Swapan Mullick, Journalist and Film Critic
Uday Shankar Pani, Writer and Filmmaker
Shri raj, Producer and Director

Non-feature films 
Aarti Srivastava, Documentary Filmmaker
Abhijit Mazumdar, Documentary Filmmaker
Gautam Benegal, Animation Filmmaker
Madhureeta Anand, Film writer and Director
Ronel Haobam, Documentary Filmmaker
Prof. Suresh Sharma, Film Critic and Documentary Filmmaker

Winners
Golden Peacock (Best Film): "Daughter"  by Reza Mirkarimi
IFFI Best Director Award: Soner Kanar and Baris Kaya for "Rauf"
IFFI Best Debut Director Award: Papa San Martin for "Rara"
IFFI Best Actor Award (Male): Silver Peacock Award:  Farhad Aslani for "Daughter"
IFFI Best Actor Award (Female): Silver Peacock Award: Elina Vaska for "Mellow Mud"
Silver Peacock Special Jury Award: "The Throne" by Lee Joon-ik
Special Mention: Tiffany Hsiung for "The Apology".

Special Awards
IFFI ICFT UNESCO Gandhi Medal: Mustafa Kara for "Cold of Kalandar"
Life Time Achievement Award - Im Kwon-taek
IFFI Indian Film Personality of the year Award: S. P. Balasubrahmanyam

Official selections

Special screenings

Opening film
"Afterimage" by Andrzej Wajda

Closing film
"The Age of Shadows" by "Kim Jee-woon"

References

External links
 

2016 film festivals
2016 festivals in Asia
International Film Festival of India
2016 in Indian cinema